Machault may refer to:

Communes of France
Machault, Ardennes, in the Ardennes département 
Machault, Seine-et-Marne, in the Seine-et-Marne département

Other names
 Fort Machault, a fort built by the French in 1754 in northwest Pennsylvania.
 French frigate Machault (1757), a French battleship built in 1757.

People
Charles-François de Machault de Belmont (1640–1709), French naval officer, governor general of the French Antilles
Guillaume de Machaut (or de Machault): (c. 1300 – April 1377), Medieval French poet and composer
Jean-Baptiste de Machault d'Arnouville: (1701–1794), French statesman